Gemmula graeffei, common name Graeffe's turrid, is a species of sea snail, a marine gastropod mollusk in the family Turridae, the turrids.

Description
The length of the shell varies between 13 mm and 35 mm.

The brownish, fusiform shell is crenulately carinate or cingulate. The ribs are lighter-colored. The median carina is stronger, with larger crenulations. The acute apex is corneous and consists of 3½ whorls. The first one is smooth, the others longitudinally plicate. The ovate aperture is plicate within. The columella is upright. The siphonal canal is long and narrow, with a narrow slit above. The acute outer lip is curved

Distribution
This marine species occurs off the Fiji Islands; Queensland, Australia; the Philippines.

References

 Brazier, J. 1876. A list of the Pleurotomidae collected during the Chevert expedition, with the description of the new species. Proceedings of the Linnean Society of New South Wales 1: 151–162 
 Hedley, C. 1922. A revision of the Australian Turridae. Records of the Australian Museum 13(6): 213–359, pls 42–56 
 Shuto, T. 1969. Neogene gastropods from Panay Island, the Philippines. Memoires of the Faculty of Science, Kyushu University 19(1): 1-250
 Cernohorsky, W.O. 1978. Tropical Pacific marine shells. Sydney : Pacific Publications 352 pp., 68 pls.
 Wilson, B. 1994. Australian marine shells. Prosobranch gastropods. Kallaroo, WA : Odyssey Publishing Vol. 2 370 pp.

External links
 Gastropods.com: Gemmula (Gemmula) graeffei
  Tucker, J.K. 2004 Catalog of recent and fossil turrids (Mollusca: Gastropoda). Zootaxa 682:1-1295.

graeffei
Gastropods described in 1875